Western Hills High School is a 9-12 secondary school in Frankfort, Kentucky. It is the more recently constructed of the two high schools in the Franklin County Public Schools district, having opened to students in 1981.  The first student body selected the Warrior as the mascot, as the feeding middle school's mascot is the Brave. However, that majority vote was overruled during that vote by the school's future first principal and the Wolverine became the mascot. There is a strong rivalry with Franklin County High School, the older school in the district.

Academics
WHHS offers two diploma choices for students: Enrichment, Academic. The Enrichment Diploma requires 26 credits. The Academic option requires 27 credits .  Students are graded on a 4-point GPA scale.

Notable alumni
J. T. Riddle (Class of 2010), Major League Baseball player
Will Chase (Class of 1988), Broadway and television star
Wan'Dale Robinson (Class of 2019), National Football League wide receiver for the New York Giants.

External links

References

1981 establishments in Kentucky
Buildings and structures in Frankfort, Kentucky
Educational institutions established in 1981
Public high schools in Kentucky
Schools in Franklin County, Kentucky